Khumariyaan is a Pashto music band from Khyber Pakthunwka province of Pakistan that also plays other styles. The band has represented their Culture abroad in Ireland, United Kingdom, United States of America, Kenya  and elsewhere.

Members
Aamer Shafiq plays guitar. He met the band members in their university in Peshawar .

Farhan Bogra plays Rubab. He also works as a cultural activist. He represents Pashto music and Pashtun culture.

Shiraz Khan is the band's percussionist. He plays a native Pushto music instrument known as the Zerbaghali, similar in shape to a Djembe. Shiraz holds a Bachelor's degree and Master's degree as well. He met with Farhan at their university. Shiraz was born in Karachi on 
5th Sept 1989. He is a father of one boy and a girl. He has 3 other siblings, 2 in Peshawar (Shahnawaz and Shahzad) and one in Dubai (Shahbaz). 

Sparlay Rawail is an architect by profession with a degree from the National College of Arts and is also an artist. He first met with the three other band members at a concert for a random Jam session. Sparlay plays lead guitar and percussion. He is son of left-wing politician Ismat Shahjahan.

Awards and nominations

See also 
 List of Pakistani music bands

References
 

Pakistani male singers
Pashto-language singers
Pashtun people
People from Peshawar
Pakistani musical groups
Musical groups from Khyber Pakhtunkhwa
Pakistani boy bands